Crouching Tiger, Hidden Dragon is a third-person beat 'em up video game with platforming elements based on the 2000 film of the same name by Ang Lee. Players may play as Li Mu Bai, Yu Shu Lien, Jen, and Lo. The award-winning soundtrack features the Academy and Grammy Award winning music composed by Tan Dun with solos by internationally acclaimed cellist Yo-Yo Ma. A GameCube version of the game was planned, but cancelled for unknown reasons.

Plot
The action is set in the Qing dynasty of 19th century China. Retiring swordsman Li decides to give his jade sword, 'The Green Destiny' to a nobleman. The sword is stolen soon after. Li goes forth to retrieve it, assisted by his friend Yu Shu Lien. The nobleman's daughter, Jen, keeps encountering both characters.

Reception

The Game Boy Advance and Xbox versions received "mixed" reviews, while the PlayStation 2 version received "unfavorable" reviews according to video game review aggregator Metacritic.

References

External links

2003 video games
3D beat 'em ups
Action-adventure games
Beat 'em ups
Cancelled GameCube games
Game Boy Advance games
PlayStation 2 games
Martial arts video games
Ubisoft games
Video games based on films
Video games developed in Japan
Video games set in China
Video games featuring female protagonists
Wuxia video games
Xbox games
Single-player video games
Genki (company) games
Video games based on works by James Schamus
Entertainment Software Publishing games
Lightweight (company) games